Donald Orr (born 9 March 1977) is a Canadian boxer. He competed in the men's middleweight event at the 2000 Summer Olympics.

References

External links
 

1977 births
Living people
Middleweight boxers
Canadian male boxers
Olympic boxers of Canada
Boxers at the 2000 Summer Olympics
Sportspeople from Surrey, British Columbia